Wilber Buddyhia Marshall (born April 18, 1962) is an American former professional football player who was a outside linebacker in the National Football League (NFL) for five teams from 1984 until 1995. Marshall played college football for the Florida Gators, was twice recognized as a consensus All-American, and is a member of the College Football Hall of Fame.

He was selected in the first round of the 1984 NFL Draft by the Chicago Bears and played in Super Bowl XX. Marshall later was part of the Super Bowl XXVI-winning Washington Redskins team, and also played for the Houston Oilers and Arizona Cardinals before finishing his career with the New York Jets.

Early years 

Marshall was born in Titusville, Florida.  He attended Astronaut High School in Titusville, where he was a Parade magazine All-American high school football player for the Astronaut War Eagles.  Future fellow NFL star Cris Collinsworth played quarterback on Astronaut's football team during Marshall's freshman year. In 2007, twenty-nine years after he graduated from high school, the Florida High School Athletic Association (FHSAA) named Marshall to its "All-Century Team", recognizing him as one of the thirty-three greatest Florida high school football players of the last 100 years.

College career 

Marshall accepted an athletic scholarship to attend the University of Florida in Gainesville, Florida, where he was first a tight-end, before becoming a star linebacker for coach Charley Pell's Gators teams from 1980 to 1983.  He was the core of a ferocious Gators defense and finished his college career with 343 tackles, fifty-eight tackles for a loss, and twenty-three quarterback sacks.  Marshall was a three-time first-team All-Southeastern Conference (SEC) selection (1981, 1982, 1983) and a two-time consensus first-team All-American (1982, 1983).  He was a finalist for the Lombardi Award in both 1982 and 1983, and was named "National Defensive Player of the Year" by ABC Sports in 1983.  The Gainesville Sun named him a first-team selection to the Gators "Team of the Century" in 1999, as well as the "Defensive Player of the Century."  Marshall was inducted into the University of Florida Athletic Hall of Fame as a "Gator Great," and was named to the University of Florida's Ring of Honor in 2007, joining Florida football greats Steve Spurrier, Jack Youngblood, Emmitt Smith and Danny Wuerffel.  Marshall was elected to the College Football Hall of Fame in 2008.  In one of a series of articles published by The Gainesville Sun in 2006, he was recognized as the No. 4 player among the top 100 all-time Florida Gators.

Professional career

Chicago Bears 

Marshall is perhaps best known as a significant member of two Super Bowl championship teams, the 1985 Bears and the 1991 Redskins.  In 1985, the Bears, behind one of the most celebrated defenses in league history, finished the regular season 15–1, shut out both opponents in the playoffs, and beat the New England Patriots 46–10 in Super Bowl XX.  In a 37–17 week 16 victory over the Detroit Lions, Marshall delivered a stunning hit on Lions' quarterback Joe Ferguson that left Ferguson flat on his back, knocked out cold.  But perhaps Marshall's most memorable moment came in the 1985 NFC Championship Game, against the Los Angeles Rams.  At the beginning of the fourth quarter, snow began to fall at Soldier Field, eliciting loud applause from the Bears fans in attendance.  On the next play, Bears defensive end Richard Dent sacked Rams quarterback Dieter Brock, causing Brock to fumble the football.  Marshall picked up the loose football and, alongside William "The Refrigerator" Perry, ran 52 yards through the falling snow.  The Bears beat the Rams 24–0, and Marshall's fumble return for a touchdown continues to be the highlight from that game most replayed.  Fox News Chicago also named that play to be the most iconic moment of the game, and of the season, as well.  He also had a good performance in the Super Bowl, recording a sack and recovering a fumble.  In 1986, Marshall recorded five interceptions, 5.5 sacks, and two defensive touchdowns, and was named first-team All-Pro for the first time.

Washington Redskins 

In the spring of 1988, Marshall became the first NFL free agent in eleven years to sign with another team, agreeing to a 5-year, $6 million contract offer to play for the Washington Redskins, the team that had eliminated the Bears from the NFL playoffs in each of the previous two seasons.  When the Bears declined to match the offer, the Redskins had to give them their two first-round draft picks in the next two NFL Drafts as compensation.

Marshall won another championship ring with the Redskins in the 1991 season, when they beat the Buffalo Bills 37–24 in Super Bowl XXVI, and Marshall finished the game with several tackles and a sack.  A week before that, he had a superb performance in the Redskins 41–10 win over the Detroit Lions, sacking Detroit quarterback Erik Kramer three times.  Marshall was named second-team All-Pro following the 1991 season and was named first-team All-Pro for the second time in his career following the 1992 season.  In 1993, Marshall reunited with Buddy Ryan, who had been the Bears' defensive coordinator during Marshall's first two seasons, signing a contract to play for the Houston Oilers.  When Ryan left the Oilers to become head coach of the Arizona Cardinals in 1994, Marshall joined him there for one season.  He then finished his NFL career in 1995 as a member of the New York Jets.

In his twelve NFL seasons, Marshall recorded forty-five sacks and intercepted twenty-three passes, which he returned for 304 yards and three touchdowns.  He also forced 24 fumbles and recovered sixteen, returning them for seventy yards and two touchdowns.  He is among the few players who have recorded twenty sacks and twenty interceptions in their career.

Life after football 
Marshall has spent much of his life after football suffering from injuries he sustained during his professional career. His health has declined as the years progressed, but Marshall has refused to receive surgery to repair his injured spine, shoulder, and knees. Marshall has battled the NFL and the players' union in court over a settlement pertaining to his injuries. Marshall prevailed in his long-pending dispute over his entitlement to total disability benefits from the Bert Bell/Pete Rozelle NFL Player Retirement Plan in 2008. However, by that time, he had filed for bankruptcy due to legal and medical expenses, and he refused to appear at a 25th anniversary tribute for the 1985 Bears team due to disagreements with the franchise owners over player treatment.

Marshall lived in the Washington DC suburbs after retirement until moving back to his hometown of Titusville, Florida several years later.

See also 

 1982 College Football All-America Team
 1983 College Football All-America Team
 Florida Gators football, 1980–89
 List of Chicago Bears first-round draft picks
 List of Chicago Bears players
 List of College Football Hall of Fame inductees (players, A–K)
 List of College Football Hall of Fame inductees (players, L–Z)
 List of Florida Gators football All-Americans
 List of Florida Gators in the NFL Draft
 List of New York Jets players
 List of Washington Redskins players
 List of University of Florida Athletic Hall of Fame members

References

Bibliography 

 Carlson, Norm, University of Florida Football Vault: The History of the Florida Gators, Whitman Publishing, LLC, Atlanta, Georgia (2007).  .
 Golenbock, Peter, Go Gators!  An Oral History of Florida's Pursuit of Gridiron Glory, Legends Publishing, LLC, St. Petersburg, Florida (2002).  .
 Hairston, Jack, Tales from the Gator Swamp: A Collection of the Greatest Gator Stories Ever Told, Sports Publishing, LLC, Champaign, Illinois (2002).  .
 McCarthy, Kevin M.,  Fightin' Gators: A History of University of Florida Football, Arcadia Publishing, Mount Pleasant, South Carolina (2000).  .
 Nash, Noel, ed., The Gainesville Sun Presents The Greatest Moments in Florida Gators Football, Sports Publishing, Inc., Champaign, Illinois (1998).  .

1962 births
Living people
All-American college football players
American football linebackers
Arizona Cardinals players
Chicago Bears players
College Football Hall of Fame inductees
Florida Gators football players
Houston Oilers players
National Conference Pro Bowl players
New York Jets players
People from Titusville, Florida
Washington Redskins players
Astronaut High School alumni